In coding theory a variable-length code is a code which  maps source symbols to a variable number of bits.

Variable-length codes can allow sources to be compressed and decompressed with zero error (lossless data compression) and still be read back symbol by symbol.  With the right coding strategy an independent and identically-distributed source may be compressed almost arbitrarily close to its entropy. This is in contrast to fixed length coding methods, for which data compression is only possible for large blocks of data, and any compression beyond the logarithm of the total number of possibilities comes with a finite (though perhaps arbitrarily small) probability of failure.

Some examples of well-known variable-length coding strategies are Huffman coding, Lempel–Ziv coding, arithmetic coding, and context-adaptive variable-length coding.

Codes and their extensions 
The extension of a code is the mapping of finite length source sequences to finite length bit strings, that is obtained by concatenating for each symbol of the source sequence the corresponding codeword produced by the original code.

Using terms from formal language theory, the precise mathematical definition is as follows: Let  and  be two finite sets, called the source and target alphabets, respectively.

Classes of variable-length codes 
Variable-length codes can be strictly nested in order of decreasing generality as non-singular codes, uniquely decodable codes and prefix codes. Prefix codes are always uniquely decodable, and these in turn are always non-singular:

Non-singular codes 
A code is non-singular if each source symbol is mapped to a different non-empty bit string, i.e. the mapping from source symbols to bit strings is injective.
 For example, the mapping  is not non-singular because both "a" and "b" map to the same bit string "0" ; any extension of this mapping will generate a lossy (non-lossless) coding. Such singular coding may still be useful when some loss of information is acceptable (for example when such code is used in audio or video compression, where a lossy coding becomes equivalent to source quantization).
 However, the mapping  is non-singular ; its extension will generate a lossless coding, which will be useful for general data transmission (but this feature is not always required). Note that it is not necessary for the non-singular code to be more compact than the source (and in many applications, a larger code is useful, for example as a way to detect and/or recover from encoding or transmission errors, or in security applications to protect a source from undetectable tampering).

Uniquely decodable codes 
A code is uniquely decodable if its extension is § non-singular. Whether a given code is uniquely decodable can be decided with the Sardinas–Patterson algorithm. 
 The mapping  is uniquely decodable (this can be demonstrated by looking at the follow-set after each target bit string in the map, because each bitstring is terminated as soon as we see a 0 bit which cannot follow any existing code to create a longer valid code in the map, but unambiguously starts a new code).
 Consider again the code   from the previous section. This code is not uniquely decodable, since the string 011101110011 can be interpreted as the sequence of codewords 01110 – 1110 – 011, but also as the sequence of codewords 011 – 1 – 011 – 10011. Two possible decodings of this encoded string are thus given by cdb and babe. However, such a code is useful when the set of all possible source symbols is completely known and finite, or when there are restrictions (for example a formal syntax) that determine if source elements of this extension are acceptable. Such restrictions permit the decoding of the original message by checking which of the possible source symbols mapped to the same symbol are valid under those restrictions.

Prefix codes 

A code is a prefix code if no target bit string in the mapping is a prefix of the target bit string of a different source symbol in the same mapping. This means that symbols can be decoded instantaneously after their entire codeword is received. Other commonly used names for this concept are prefix-free code, instantaneous code, or context-free code.
 The example mapping  in the previous paragraph is not a prefix code because we don't know after reading the bit string "0" if it encodes an "a" source symbol, or if it is the prefix of the encodings of the "b" or "c" symbols.
 An example of a prefix code is shown below.

 Example of encoding and decoding:
  → 00100110111010 → |0|0|10|0|110|111|0|10| → 

A special case of prefix codes are block codes. Here all codewords must have the same length. The latter are not very useful in the context of source coding, but often serve as error correcting codes in the context of channel coding.

Another special case of prefix codes are variable-length quantity codes, which encode arbitrarily large integers as a sequence of octets—i.e., every codeword is a multiple of 8 bits.

Advantages 
The advantage of a variable-length code is that unlikely source symbols can be assigned longer codewords and likely source symbols can be assigned shorter codewords, thus giving a low expected codeword length.
 .
As the entropy of this source is 1.7500 bits per symbol, this code compresses the source as much as possible so that the source can be recovered with zero error.

See also 
 Variable-length instruction sets in computing

References

Further reading 
  Draft available online

Coding theory
Lossless compression algorithms